Epischnia agnieleae is a species of snout moth in the genus Epischnia. It was described by Patrice J.A. Leraut in 2003 and is known from France.

References

Moths described in 2003
Phycitini
Moths of Europe